11277 Ballard, provisional designation , is a Phocaea asteroid from the inner regions of the asteroid belt, approximately  in diameter. It was discovered on 8 October 1988, by American astronomer couple Carolyn and Eugene Shoemaker at the Palomar Observatory in California. The assumed S-type asteroid has a rotation period of at least 10 hours. It was named for American marine scientist Robert Ballard.

Orbit and classification 

Ballard is a member of the Phocaea family. It orbits the Sun in the inner asteroid belt at a distance of 1.83–2.98 AU once every 3 years and 9 months (1,360 days; semi-major axis of 2.4 AU). Its orbit has an eccentricity of 0.24 and an inclination of 23° with respect to the ecliptic. The body's observation arc begins with a precovery taken at Palomar in September 1988, just four weeks prior to its official discovery observation. Ballard is not a Mars-crosser, since its aphelion is larger than 1.67 AU.

Naming 

This minor planet was named after American marine scientist Robert Ballard (born 1942), a professor of oceanography and director of the Deep Submergence Laboratory, who is known for the discovery of the RMS Titanic and the German battleship Bismarck. The official naming citation was published by the Minor Planet Center on 26 May 2002.

Physical characteristics 

Ballard is an assumed, stony S-type asteroid, in line with the Phocaea family's overall spectral type.

Rotation period 

In July 2010, a rotational lightcurve of Ballard was obtained from two nights of photometric observations in the R-band by Italian astronomer Albino Carbognani at the OAVdA Observatory  in Italy. Lightcurve analysis gave a tentative rotation period of at least 10 hours with a brightness amplitude of more than 0.25 magnitude.

Diameter and albedo 

According to the survey carried out by the NEOWISE mission of NASA's Wide-field Infrared Survey Explorer, Ballard measures between 5.65 and 6.445 kilometers in diameter and its surface has an albedo between 0.19 and 0.289.

The Collaborative Asteroid Lightcurve Link assumes an albedo of 0.23 – derived from the family's largest member, 25 Phocaea – and calculates a diameter of 6.65 kilometers based on an absolute magnitude of 13.1.

References

External links 
 Asteroid Lightcurve Database (LCDB), query form (info )
 Dictionary of Minor Planet Names, Google books
 Discovery Circumstances: Numbered Minor Planets (10001)-(15000) – Minor Planet Center
 
 

011277
Discoveries by Carolyn S. Shoemaker
Discoveries by Eugene Merle Shoemaker
Named minor planets
19881008